It's Nice Up North is a 2006 comedy documentary made by comedian Graham Fellows as his alter ego John Shuttleworth.

It was filmed by photographer Martin Parr and edited by Fellows on his laptop on a very low budget.

In the film Shuttleworth travels to the Shetland Islands to test his theory that the further north in Great Britain you go the nicer people are, Shetland being the most far north part of the UK. He meets various Shetland people in unrehearsed situations. Many assume him to be a real person and not a comic creation, though some scenes are acted, particularly parts with famous local tour guide Elma Johnson.

It had a limited theatrical release in some art-house and community cinemas around the UK in 2006, including some screenings in Shetland, with Fellows answering questions after the showing. The film was released on DVD in the same year. The film has also been shown on Sky Arts.

References

External links
Ken Worthington's YouTube Channel - clips from It's Nice Up North and more on Ken Worthington's YouTube website channel
John Shuttleworth Appreciation Society Website - The Official John Shuttleworth Appreciation Society Internet Presence

2006 films
British mockumentary films
2006 comedy films
British comedy films
Mass media in Shetland
2000s English-language films
2000s British films